KCDN-LD, virtual channel 43 (UHF digital channel 23), is a low-powered Daystar owned-and-operated television station licensed to Kansas City, Missouri, United States and serving the Kansas City metropolitan area. The station is owned by Daystar's parent company, Word of God Fellowship, Inc.

History
The station began as K35CT in 1989. In 2004, K35CT increased its power, and it changed its callsign to KCDN-LP, but it remained on channel 35. The station switched over to digital broadcasting in 2012, changing to the current KCDN-LD call sign on May 15, 2012.

Digital programming

Digital channels
The station's digital signal is multiplexed:

References

External links

Daystar Television Network official site

Television stations in the Kansas City metropolitan area
Daystar (TV network) affiliates
Television channels and stations established in 1989
1989 establishments in Kansas
Low-power television stations in the United States